Donald William Beaupre (born September 19, 1961) is a Canadian former professional ice hockey goaltender who played in the National Hockey League (NHL) for 17 seasons with the Minnesota North Stars, Washington Capitals, Ottawa Senators, and Toronto Maple Leafs. 

A two-time NHL All-Star, Beaupre played in the 33rd National Hockey League All-Star Game in 1981 and 43rd National Hockey League All-Star Game in 1992. As a rookie in 1981, Beaupre appeared in the Stanley Cup Finals with the North Stars, losing to the New York Islanders.

Playing career
Beaupre emerged as a goaltender in the OHA for the Sudbury Wolves.  In 1979–80 he won 28 games and was named to the league's first All-star team.

As one of the top rated goalies in the 1980 NHL Entry Draft, Beaupre didn't last very long and was claimed 37th overall by the Minnesota North Stars.  In 1981 with Minnesota, Beaupre split goaltending with Gilles Meloche and in his rookie year appeared in the 1981 All-Star Game (his other All-Star appearance would come in 1993), and although Minnesota would lose the series, recorded a 4–2 win in Game 4 of the 1981 Stanley Cup Finals against the powerful New York Islanders.

Traded in 1989 to the Washington Capitals, Beaupre continued to play well and benefit from Washington's solid defense in the early 1990s. He led the NHL with five shutouts in 1990–91, then won a career-high 29 games the next year. By the mid-'90s, the Capitals were looking to Olaf Kolzig to lead them in goal. Beaupre was shipped to the weak Ottawa Senators where he saw plenty of rubber in 71 games over two seasons. Beaupre became the first Ottawa netminder to register a shutout. By the time he was traded to Toronto in 1995–96, the veteran's reflexes were disappearing with age. He retired in 1997, after spending most of the season with the St. John's Maple Leafs of the AHL.

Beaupre is the owner and president of an aerial lift equipment company in Minneapolis.

Career statistics

Regular season and playoffs

References

External links

Don Beaupre hockeygoalies profile

1961 births
Living people
Baltimore Skipjacks players
Birmingham South Stars players
Canadian expatriate ice hockey players in the United States
Canadian ice hockey goaltenders
Franco-Ontarian people
Canadian people of German descent
Ice hockey people from Ontario
Kalamazoo Wings (1974–2000) players
Minnesota North Stars draft picks
Minnesota North Stars players
Nashville South Stars players
National Hockey League All-Stars
Ottawa Senators players
Sportspeople from Waterloo, Ontario
St. John's Maple Leafs players
Salt Lake Golden Eagles (CHL) players
Sudbury Wolves players
Toronto Maple Leafs players
Utah Grizzlies (IHL) players
Washington Capitals players